The Erdős–Rényi Prize of the Network Science Society is named for Paul Erdős and Alfréd Rényi. This international prize is awarded annually in a special ceremony at the International Conference on Network Science to an outstanding early-career researcher in the field of network science.

Past recipients include:

 2012: Roger Guimera, Rovira i Virgili University, for work on the "analysis of network cartography and community identification".
 2013: Adilson E. Motter, Northwestern University, for work on "synchronization phenomena"."
 2014: Mason A. Porter, University of Oxford, for research in the "mathematics of networks".
 2015: Chaoming Song, University of Miami, for work including the application of "self-similarity and renormalization group theory" to networks.
 2016: Aaron Clauset, University of Colorado Boulder, for work on the structure of networks.
 2017: Vittoria Colizza, Inserm, for research into "network-based modeling of epidemic processes".
 2018: Danielle Bassett, University of Pennsylvania, for work on the "network architecture of the human brain".
 2019: Tiago P. Peixoto, Central European University, for his contributions to statistical inference and visualisation of networks.
 2020: Sonia Kéfi, CNRS, "for foundational and empirically grounded theoretical research that has advanced network science and its applications in ecology, with a focus on multiple types of interactions among species and the implications for global change, opening the path to new ways to study ecosystems"
 2021: Dashun Wang, Northwestern University, for his work in network science and computational social science.
 2022: Linyuan Lü, University of Electronic Science and Technology of China, "For groundbreaking contributions to network information filtering, including seminal works on link prediction and detection of influential nodes in networked structures and their technological applications."

See also 

 List of computer science awards

References

Computer science awards